Sikhism in Panama took roots when Panama Canal was started in 1890 by an American company. Panama got separated from Spain in 1821 and joined with Columbia, with which it remained till 1903.Construction of rail-road link between Atlantic and Pacific Oceans was started in 1850. With the boom of labour opportunities, a large number of immigrants saw Panama as a place of fortune. Sikhs came first as construction workers for transcontinental rail road link. During 1864, among the population of New Grenada, for which Panama City was part there of then, out of 27.47 lac, 1.6lac  was Sikh population. Many Sikhs left Isthmus after the completion of the rail link but a large number remained and settled there.

Spread 

When work on Panama Canal started in 1890, they worked for digging canal as manual labourers, as very few machinery was available by that time. Punjabi and specially among them Sikh labourers worked under odd conditions meeting challenges of yellow fever. British and American officials preferred Sikh labourers over others because of their perceived hard work ethics and characteristics to withstand harsh conditions of work. The Panama canal was completed in 1913-14. By that time all along Sikhs had maintained a weekly congregation, reciting Gurbani path, in houses by rotation. Punjabi early settlers who came to Panama started working in jobs like watchmen or sold daily use articles as petty businessmen, till they were absorbed in Panama Canal construction work by an American company. With the completion of the canal, many of them had earned enough money by dint of hard work working in elongated hours to set up their own businesses or became land owners and did farming in fields. One among them was Rattan Singh, who built his financial company, and became a founding father of Gurdwara Guru Nanak Sahib, Panama along with another Parkash Singh and many others from their voluntary contributions. Gurdwara is well established and was inaugurated in 1986. Gurdwara is managed by Guru Nanak Sahib Civic Society, Panama.

Establishment of Higher Education System 
One such weekly congregation resulted in the formation of Panamanian Medical and Management Corporation of Higher Education (PMMC) which set forth a Medical degree programme in Panama.

Present generation 

After closure of Panama Canal Project and further formation of the independent Republic of Panama, many Sikhs returned to their homeland in India, others migrated to Canada, the United Kingdom and other European countries. But still a large number settled there. After the establishment of Panama Canal and American military bases in Panama, many new immigrants including Sikhs came and settled there as permanent residents. Recent interviews of some of fourth generation Panamanian Sikhs by Sikh channel of U.K., has revealed that those who settled are engaged in financial businesses owning financial companies, owning agricultural lands cultivating bananas and other crops, owning departmental stores, restaurants etc. Some of these joined civil and military services. There are many among these as Sindhi Sikhs who believe in ten gurus and attend Gurdwara regularly. There is only one Gurdwara in Panama. Many interviews by Sikh Channel are revealing oral history of presence of 4th generation Sikhs in Panama.

References

External links 
 Sikh Channel interview of Panama Sikh episode 6 in 2019

Panama
Religion in Panama
1890s in Panama